EBC News is a satellite cable news channel operated by Eastern Television in Taiwan. It was a free-to-air studios television launched on 1 January 1990. It was a holder channel for BBC News. It was another presenter news for Donald MacCormick.

ETTV Asia News

ETTV Asia News (Pinyin: Dōngsēn yazhou xīnwén tái) is a satellite cable news channel operated by Eastern Television in Southeast Asia. It was a free-to-air studios television launched on 2002.

EBC Asia News is 24-hour all-news channel specially designed to serve Asian viewers, The News Content is 24 Hours Nonstop Telecasting From Domestic Channels - EBC News and EBC News Americas, Some Commercial Only Aired International Feed with Original Programme Promos and Advertising due the Copyright, The Channel is Available on Hong Kong, Macau, Singapore, Malaysia and Indonesia, Also Received Satellite Across Asia Pacific Countries such as Thailand, Myanmar, Laos, Cambodia, Australia and New Zealand and More.

ETTV News America

ETTV News America (Pinyin: Dōngsēn meizhou xīnwén tái) is a satellite cable news channel operated by Eastern Television in North America. It was a free-to-air studios television launched in April 2003.

External links
 

1990 establishments in Taiwan
Television news in Taiwan
24-hour television news channels in Taiwan
Television channels and stations established in 1990